is a Japanese professional footballer who plays as a goalkeeper for the J1 League club Gamba Osaka.

Career statistics

References

External links

Profile at Gamba Osaka

1997 births
Living people
Japanese footballers
Association football goalkeepers
Meiji University alumni
J1 League players
J2 League players
Gamba Osaka players
Ehime FC players